Judge Maloney may refer to:

Paul Lewis Maloney (born 1949), judge of the United States District Court for the Western District of Michigan
Robert B. Maloney (born 1933), judge of the United States District Court for the Northern District of Texas
Thomas J. Maloney (judge) (1925–2008), judge in Cook County, Illinois

See also
Anthony William Maloney (1928–2004), justice of the Supreme Court of Ontario and husband of Marian Maloney